Learning to Walk is a compilation album by UK indie band The Boo Radleys, released by Rough Trade Records in 1992.

It is a collection of the band's first three EPs, Kaleidoscope (1990), Every Heaven (1991) and Boo! Up (1991), as well as two previously unreleased covers, "Alone Again Or" and "Boo! Faith". The band's 1992 EP Adrenalin is not represented, as it was released on a separate record label.

The covers of "Alone Again Or" (originally by Love) and "Boo! Faith" (New Order's "True Faith", retitled) are taken from the band's second and third Peel Sessions, from 1991.

Track listing
All tracks written by Martin Carr, except track 9 by Carr and Bryan MacLean and track 14 by The Boo Radleys and New Order.

"Kaleidoscope" (EP version)
"How I Feel"
"Aldous"
"Swansong"
"The Finest Kiss"
"Tortoiseshell"
"Bluebird"
"Naomi"
"Alone Again Or" 
"Everybird"
"Sometime Soon She Said"
"Foster's Van"
"Song for Up!"
"Boo! Faith"

Notes
Tracks 1 - 4   from the Kaleidoscope   EP
Tracks 5 - 8   from the Every Heaven   EP
Track 9   from a Peel Session first broadcast April 1991
Tracks 10 - 13   from the Boo Up!    EP
Track 14   from a Peel Session first broadcast October 1991

References

The Boo Radleys albums
1992 compilation albums
Rough Trade Records compilation albums